Stoney River Steakhouse & Grill is a chain of steakhouses in the United States. There are ten Stoney River restaurants in Georgia, Maryland, Illinois, Kentucky, Missouri, and Tennessee. The chain is owned by J. Alexander's.

References

External links

Fidelity National Financial
Companies based in Nashville, Tennessee
Economy of the Southeastern United States
Regional restaurant chains in the United States
Steakhouses in the United States
Restaurants established in 2000